At the 1896 Summer Olympics, three fencing events were contested at the Zappeion. They were prepared and organized by the Sub-Committee for Fencing.  The épée event for men was cancelled.  All fencing was done to three touches.  Events were held on 7 April and 9 April 1896.  15 athletes from four nations competed; 8 fencers from 3 nations won one medal each.

Medal summary

These medals are retroactively assigned by the International Olympic Committee; at the time, winners were given a silver medal.

Participating nations

A total of 15 fencers from four nations competed at the Athens Games:

Medal table

Sub-Committee for Fencing
 Ioannis Phokianos, president
 Georgios Streit, secretary
 Ioannis Yenissarlis
 Loukas Belos
 Nikolaos Politis
 Chas. Waldstein
 Dimitrios Aiginitis
 Dimitrios Sekkeris
 Spyridon Koumoundouros
 Konstantinos Manos
 Spyridon Antonopoulos

See also

List of Olympic medalists in fencing (men)
List of Olympic medalists in fencing (women)

References

External links
  (Digitally available at )
  (Excerpt available at )
 

 
1896 Summer Olympics events
1896
1896 in fencing
International fencing competitions hosted by Greece